West Islip is a hamlet and CDP founded roughly in 1683, located in the Town of Islip in Suffolk County, New York, United States. Situated on the South Shore of Long Island, the population of the CDP was 27,048 at the time of the 2020 census.

Geography
West Islip is located at  (40.715008, -73.297746).

Great South Bay, Jones Beach Island and Fire Island lie to the south. Babylon and North Babylon form the western border. Bay Shore lies to the east, and in the north West Islip borders on Deer Park and Brentwood. West Islip's western boundary is a natural one formed by Sampawams Creek, Hawley's Lake, and the Guggenheim Lakes.

Demographics

History
The first people to settle in the area were the Secatogue Indians. The unearthing of an Indian burial ground north of West Islip beach enabled historians to reconstruct a village of these Indians who lived along the edges of the Great South Bay, Sampawams Creek, Trues Creek and Willetts Creek.

Farming and fishing were the main occupations. In the mid-19th century, the completion of the Long Island Rail Road brought travelers to West Islip.

Today West Islip has its own fire department, post office, public library and Good Samaritan Hospital. A short drive affords access to good fishing and swimming.

Demographics of the CDP
As of the census of 2020, there were 27,048 people in 9,040 households in the CDP. The racial makeup of the CDP was 95.9% White, 1.7% Asian, 0.6% Black, 0.1% Native American, and 0.6% from other races, and 1.1% being multiracial.

There were 7,459 families, out of which 39.4% had children under the age of 18 living with them, 68.2% were married couples living together, 10.3% had a female householder with no husband present, and 17.5% were non-families. Nearly 11.4% of all households were made up of individuals, and 6.9% had someone living alone who was 65 years of age or older. The average household size was 3.09, and the average family size was 3.43.

In the CDP, the population was spread out, with 25.6% under the age of 18, 4.0% from 18 to 24, 31.8% from 25 to 44, 21.9% from 45 to 64, and 12.2% who were 65 years of age or older. The median age was 37 years.

The median income for a household in the CDP was $103,789, and the median income for a family was $117,451. Males had a median income of $75,868 versus $54,389 for females. The per capita income for the CDP was $38,933. About 2.9% of families and 3.4% of the population were below the poverty line, including 4.9% of those under age 18 and 4.3% of those age 65 or over.

Transportation

Health
 Good Samaritan Hospital Medical Center
 AFC Urgent Care West Islip
 ProHEALTH Urgent Care of West Islip
 Northwell Health-GoHealth Urgent Care

Education

Public school districts:
 West Islip School District

Private schools:
 St. John the Baptist Diocesan High School 
 Our Lady of Lourdes School
 The Bridges Academy

Public libraries:
 West Islip Public Library

In popular culture
Flash-based internet cartoon series Homestar Runner references West Islip in the cartoon "old comics". An apparent West Islip resident e-mails Strong Bad, which results in the character mispronouncing the name of the town as "is-lip" rather than the common pronunciation "ice-lip". Strong Bad also parodies the name, imagining West Islip as a "British new wave band". A poster for the fictional band later appears in the character's video game, Strong Bad's Cool Game for Attractive People.

Notable people
 Matt Anderson, New Jersey Devils forward
 A. J. Benza, gossip columnist and television host
 Tom Bohrer, two time Olympic silver medalist in the coxless four (1988 and 1992) and head coach of the Boston University Men's Crew.
 Sal Caccavale, former MLS player for the New York Red Bulls
 Kevin Cosgrove, victim of the September 11th terrorist attacks whose 9-1-1 call and last words were recorded
 Thomas Joseph Downey, congressman from 1975 to 1993, West Islip High School Class of 1966
 Edie Falco, actress best known for her role on the long-running hit TV series The Sopranos
 Sean Henry, CEO of the Nashville Predators
 John J. Flanagan, New York State Senator 
 Aidan Kelly,  2014 USA Olympic Luge slider
 Mike Komisarek, retired NHL player for the Toronto Maple Leafs
 Rick Lazio, 1976 WIHS graduate, member of the U.S. House of Representatives from New York's 2nd congressional district, 1993–2001
 Ken Marino, best known for his work with MTV’s The State and Wet Hot American Summer
 Al Oerter, Olympic discus thrower. Prior to Mexico City Olympics in 1968 he lived in West Islip and would frequently work out at the high school field.
 Gary Sullivan, professional soccer player
 Brett Swenson, placekicker in the NFL (Indianapolis Colts) born in West Islip
 Kris Statlander, professional wrestler for All Elite Wrestling
 Nick Tropeano, Major League Baseball pitcher
 Frank Vignola, virtuoso guitarist
 Jarett Gandolfo, New York State Assemblyman
 Maria Tash, jewelry designer and founder of the eponymous luxury piercing and fine jewelry brand

References

External links

 West Islip Historical Society
 West Islip (Long Island Oddities)

Islip (town), New York
Census-designated places in New York (state)
Census-designated places in Suffolk County, New York
Populated coastal places in New York (state)